Piotr Szczęsny (1963, Białystok – 29 October 2017, Warsaw) was a Polish chemist and a Mensa member who committed suicide by immolation in protest against the policies of the ruling Law and Justice government.

He studied chemistry at Jagiellonian University and became a member of the Independent Students' Union. He worked in the 1980s in the "Solidarność" union federation. After graduation, he remained as an assistant at the university, began his doctoral thesis. After 1989, he left the university and became co-founder of a publishing house, which edited manuals on chemistry. For ten years, he held the post of Chairman of a Society for Continuing Vocational Training. He worked as a consultant on business issues. In 2016 he closed his company.

He burned himself as a sign of political protest. On 19 October 2017, he distributed copies of a self-composed leaflet in front of the Palace of Culture and Science, poured flammable liquid over himself and set himself on fire. He died in hospital ten days later. Following Szczęsny's death, the government media declared him mentally unstable.

Szczęsny lived in Niepołomice; his wife is a pharmacist and their two children were studying for their doctorates. He was not involved in any political action of the Polish opposition and had suffered from depression for the last eight years of his life. In a letter to his family, he stated that his deed was not motivated by his condition. Szczęsny's suicide received considerable publicity and a march held to honour him was attended by several hundred people.

Piotr Szczęsny was buried on 14 November 2017 at the Kraków Salwator Cemetery in the presence of thousands of mourners from all over Poland.

See also
 Ryszard Siwiec
 Romas Kalanta
 List of political self-immolations

References

External links 

 Ja, zwykły, szary człowiek wolność kocham ponad wszystko – list do rodaków
  Mourning Poland’s Anti-Populist Martyr 26 October 2017
 Polish Man Dies After Setting Self On Fire In Protest 30 October 2017

Polish chemists
Mensans
Suicides by self-immolation
Suicides in Poland
1963 births
2017 suicides